Trézilidé is a commune in the Finistère department of Brittany in northwestern France.

Population
Inhabitants of Trézilidé are called Trézilidéens in French.

See also
Communes of the Finistère department

References

External links

Mayors of Finistère Association 

Communes of Finistère